Germaine Charley (1887–1959) was a French stage and film actress.

Selected filmography
 The Regiment's Champion (1932)
 Bach the Millionaire (1933)
 The Uncle from Peking (1934)
 Barnabé (1938)
 Sacred Woods (1939)
 The Porter from Maxim's (1939)
 Mademoiselle Béatrice (1943)
 Her Final Role (1946)
 Virgile (1953)

References

Bibliography
 Goble, Alan. The Complete Index to Literary Sources in Film. Walter de Gruyter, 1999.

External links

1887 births
1959 deaths
French film actresses
Actresses from Paris